Macrurocampa marthesia, the mottled prominent, is a species of prominent moth in the family Notodontidae. It was described by Pieter Cramer in 1780 and is found in North America.

The MONA or Hodges number for Macrurocampa marthesia is 7975.

References

 Lafontaine, J. Donald & Schmidt, B. Christian (2010). "Annotated check list of the Noctuoidea (Insecta, Lepidoptera) of North America north of Mexico". ZooKeys. 40: 1-239.

Further reading

 Arnett, Ross H. (2000). American Insects: A Handbook of the Insects of America North of Mexico. CRC Press.

Caterpillars of Eastern Forests Link - https://www.fs.fed.us/foresthealth/technology/pdfs/Caterpillars_of_Eastern_Forests.pdf

Notodontidae